Rock & Roll Is Dead is the sixth studio album released by the Swedish rock band The Hellacopters. The first edition of the CD came with a 25-minute bonus DVD entitled Poking at the Stiff and chronicled the second of the two weeks of recording the album. The vinyl release had seven different colors of the vinyl: brown, green, white, clear, orange, red and black. There was also picture disc from Sacred Heart Recordings available in a limited run of 200 units with the inner sleeve artwork printed on the vinyl and the songs "It Might Mean Something To You" and "Positively So Naive" as bonus tracks.

The song "I'm in the Band" is available as a bonus song in the game Guitar Hero III: Legends of Rock and "Bring It on Home" can be heard in the game NHL 07.

Track listing

Personnel 
The Hellacopters
Nicke Andersson – Vocals guitars, piano, percussion
Robert Dahlqvist – Guitars, vocals
Kenny Håkansson – Bass guitar
Anders Lindström – Organ, piano, guitar, backing vocals
Robert Eriksson – Drums, backing vocals

Additional musicians
Pelle Almqvist – Howl
Linn Segolsson – Backing vocals
Clarisse Muvemba – Backing vocals
Mattias Bärjed – Acoustic guitar
Johan Bååth – Hand claps

Production
Chips Kiesbye – Producer, engineer
Michael Ibert – Engineer
Janne hansson – Engineer
Henrik Johnsson – Mastering

References 

2005 albums
The Hellacopters albums